The IMOCA 60 Class yacht FRA 101 - Foncia designed by Farr Yacht Design and launched in the year 2007.

Racing Results

Gallery

Name / Ownership

Michel Desjoyeaux - Foncia

Jeremy Beyou - Maitre Coq

Jean Le Cam - Yes We Cam
The boat competed under the following name with Jean Le Cam Hubert, FRA 1, Finistère Mer Vent, FRA 001, Corum L'Epargne, FRA 2019 and Yes We Cam

References 

2000s sailing yachts
Sailing yachts designed by Farr Yacht Design
Vendée Globe boats
IMOCA 60